The Milltown Institute of Theology and Philosophy was a Jesuit-run institution of higher education and research, located in Dublin, Ireland. It was located in Ranelagh, County Dublin.

From November 1989, when it was granted designated status under the National Council for Educational Awards, it developed and offered civil programmes leading to Bachelor, Masters and Doctoral awards.

From 2005 until 2015, it was a "Recognised College" of the National University of Ireland. Under the 1997 Universities Act, the Irish government removed the ban on the NUI awarding degrees in Theology which had stood since its foundation and its predecessor the Royal University of Ireland.

The Milltown Institute was also an Ecclesiastical Faculty with official designation by the Congregation for Catholic Education in Rome.

By 2011, the future of the Milltown Institute had become uncertain  and it was finally decided to close the Institute permanently.

Jesuit Novitiate

The origins of the institute can be traced back to 1860, when the Jesuits in Ireland became a separate Province (since 1830 it had been a sub-province). A Jesuit Novitiate was established in Milltown Park and the Jesuits established a School of Philosophy (Philosophate) and a School of Theology (Theologate) at Milltown. Jesuits studied for secular degrees in University College Dublin (for a time under the control of the Jesuits) and did their religious studies at Milltown, as the National University of Ireland (like the Royal University of Ireland before it) was prohibited from awarding Theology degrees. The School of Theology had had an unbroken history at Milltown since 1889, and became a Jesuit Pontifical Faculty in 1932. The School of Philosophy moved from Milltown in 1930 to St Stanislaus College, Tullabeg, Co. Offaly, became a Jesuit Pontifical Faculty in 1948, and returned to Milltown in 1962. In 1949 land adjacent to Milltown Park was purchased by Rector O'Grady, where Gonzaga College was opened in 1950 and in 1951 the Catholic Workers College (later the National College of Industrial Relations now the National College of Ireland) was set up. 
In the 1960s the public Milltown Lectures were conducted. With the decline in vocations, the Milltown Institute was created in 1968.

Rectors of Milltown Park
 Fr. Daniel Jones, S.J.
 Fr. Edmund O'Reilly, S.J. (1863-1870)
 Fr. William Sutton, S.J. (1895-1903)
 Fr. Peter Finlay, S.J. (1905-1910)
 Fr. Albert Power S.J. (1910-1918)
 Fr. Martin  Maher S.J. (1918-?)
 Fr. Fergus O'Donoghue S.J. 
 Fr. Joseph Lentaigne S.J.
 Fr. John Hannon S.J. (1924-1930)
 Fr. Cyril Power S.J. (1930-1938)
 Fr. John McMahon, S.J. (1938-
 Fr. Michael Aloysius (Louis) O'Grady, S.J. (1947-1953) became provincial in 1953
 Bp. James Corboy, S.J., (1959-1962), became Bishop of Monze, Zambia
 Fr. Cecil McGarry, S.J., became Provincial in 1968, and later served the East African Province
 Fr. Noel Barber, S.J.,
 Fr. Conall O'Cuinn S.J., BSc(Hons), BPhil, BD (2010-2014)
 Fr. Bill Callanan S.J., BA, MPhil

Miltown Institute
Milltown Institute was established as a Pontifical Athenaeum with Faculties of Theology and Philosophy by a group of religious institutes in 1968. In 1968 the Carmelites, who previously had trained in Gort Mhuire, began studying in Milltown. 1979 saw the Bachelor of Divinity (BD) programme approved by the Teaching Council of Ireland.

The Lonergan Centre, a research centre for the study of the works of Canadian theologian and philosopher Bernard Lonergan, was founded in 1975 in Milltown by Conn O’Donovan SJ and Philip McShane SJ.

In 1984 a programme of studies in Spirituality was introduced. The Pastoral Department came into being in 1987, with its one-year Diploma in Pastoral Studies. In 1989 a two-year evening adult theology course commenced.

In 1989 Certificates and Diplomas were validated by the Irish Government's National Council for Education Awards (NCEA), the forerunner of HETAC, for the first time, and Milltown became a designated NCEA centre.

In 1993, the BA programmes in Theology and Philosophy and the National Diploma in Philosophical Studies joined the CAO system for applications to third-level courses; from 1994 degree students were eligible to apply for Higher Education Grants; and in 1995 students of NCEA courses became eligible for the government free fees initiative. In 1996, the BA was recognised by the Teaching Council of Ireland for the teaching of religion in post-primary/secondary schools.

2001 saw the start of the MA in Applied Spirituality, validated by HETAC until NUI recognition in 2005; this programme moved to All Hallows College in 2012.

An undergraduate Bachelor of Theology programme in conjunction with the University of Wales, Lampeter, was launched in September 2003. The institute also developed a number of post-graduate initiatives with Lampeter.

In 2003 the Kimmage Mission Institute (KMI) Institute of Theology and Cultures moved from Kimmage Manor to Milltown, becoming part of the Department of Mission Theology and Culture, and from 2006 the alliance was made permanent.

The KMI Bachelor of Arts in Theology and Anthropology degree was also recognised as a qualification for teaching religion in post-primary schools.
From 1 September 2005 until 2015, Milltown was a Recognised College of the National University of Ireland (NUI). Education Minister Mary Hannifan and NUI Chancellor Garret Fitzgerald attended the ceremony bestowing Recognised College status on Milltown.

Milltown validated certificate, diploma, bachelor's degree and master's degree courses for The Carmelite Institute of Britain and Ireland (CIBI) from 2006 until 2015. The director of CIBI and Dean of Theology at Milltown, Patrick Mullins OCarm, ran distance learning theology programmes for Milltown as www.onlinemilltown.com.

Closure
The Milltown Institute closed at the end of July 2015. After the Jesuit-founded University College Dublin rejected Milltown's approaches the institution negotiated with Trinity College Dublin to continue its existence as the Loyola Institute in a centre of study, along with the Irish School of Ecumenics. The property in Milltown was sold and a new facility was established at Trinity College Dublin's campus in the centre of Dublin. Staff and faculty members who held positions until 2011, for the most part, did not continue within the new Loyola Institute. The final conferring of Ecclesiastical and HETAC awards took place on 2 October 2012, with NUI awards on 3 October 2012. The Carmelite programmes moved back to the Carmelite Institute of Britain and Ireland in Gort Mhuire in 2015, and programmes began to be awarded by Maynooth College. Most of the buildings at Milltown Park, some 10.5 acres of the 18 acre site, were sold in 2020.

The Jesuit Library
Since the foundation at Milltown Park of the Jesuit Schools of Philosophy and Theology, the Irish Jesuits had gathered publications, and the library finally held 140,000 volumes and over 2000 journals. A purpose-built Jesuit Library was opened in 1938 to house the collection. The Library had also increased its holdings on spirituality when the programme was run in Milltown; although some of this was transferred All Hallows from 2016, much of this library returned to Milltown to form the Spirituality Institute Library.

Library Sale
Following the closure of the Institute, books from its library were sold in London in 2017 by Sotheby's. The sale included rare and important books bequeathed to the Irish province of the Jesuits by the bibliophile judge William O'Brien upon his death in 1899.

Jesuit DCU Partnership
The Dublin City University Jesuit Library Partnership saw the Milltown Park Library's 140,000 volumes move to Woodlock Hall in DCU's All Hallows College Campus, where the Theology faculty is based, on a ten-year loan.

Spirituality Institute for Research and Education (SpIRE)
SpIRE was set up in 2016 SpIRE to raise awareness of spirituality as an applied academic discipline. Starting in August 2016, SpIRE in conjunction with the Waterford Institute of Technology, it delivers an MA in Applied Spirituality from All Hallows College, Dublin.

Milltown Studies
Milltown Studies was a twice-yearly journal, first published in 1977 by the Milltown Institute, on theology, philosophy spirituality, literature, culture and history. Contributors included Lambert McKenna SJ, Thomas Morrissey SJ, Martin McNamara, John Navone SJ, Thomas O'Loughlin, Mary Midgley and Imogen Stuart. It ceased publication in 2015 after a double edition (Nos. 77 & 78).

People Associated with the Milltown Institute

Presidents of the Milltown Institute
 James McPolin SJ president (1983–1989)
 Paul Lennon OCarm (1989–1995) first non-jesuit president
 John Macken SJ president (1995–1996)
 Brian Grogan SJ served as president of the institute (–2006)
 Bernadette Flannagn PBVM acting president (2006–2007) – director of Spirituality Institute 
 Finbar Clancy SJ acting president (2008)
 Cornelius J Casey CSsR president (2008–2010) – formerly president of Kimmage Mission Institute (1996–1999)
 Thomas R. Whelan CSsP president/rector (2010– ) – formerly president of Kimmage Mission Institute (2001–2003)

People who have Studied at Milltown
 Pope Francis spent eight weeks in Milltown studying English in 1980.
 Stephen Chow, Bishop of Hong Kong, graduated with a Licentiate in Philosophy
 Paul Dempsey (bishop), Bishop of Achonry, completed a master's degree in theology in Milltown 
 Mary McAleese, former Irish president, earned a H.Dip. and MA in canon law from Milltown
 Alan McGuckian, Bishop of Raphoe, studied philosophy at Milltown

See also
 List of Jesuit educational institutions
 List of Jesuit sites in Ireland

External links
Milltown Institute Official Website
National University of Ireland Official Website

References

National University of Ireland
Religion in Dublin (city)
Education in Dublin (city)
Catholic universities and colleges in the Republic of Ireland
Jesuit universities and colleges
Milltown, Dublin